is a Japanese light novel series written by Nazuna Miki and illustrated by Subachi. It was published in the user-generated novel publishing website Shōsetsuka ni Narō from February 2017 to April 2020. It was later acquired by Kodansha, who has released seven volumes since August 2017 under their Kodansha Ranobe Books imprint.

A manga adaptation illustrated by Mawata has been serialized in Kodansha's Niconico Seiga–based manga service Suiyōbi no Sirius since May 2018, with its chapters collected into ten tankōbon volumes as of October 2022. An anime television series adaptation by Maho Film will premiere in July 2023.

Characters

Media

Light novels
Written by Nazuna Miki, My Unique Skill Makes Me OP Even at Level 1 was published in the user-generated novel publishing website Shōsetsuka ni Narō from February 24, 2017, to April 19, 2020. The series was later acquired by Kodansha, who began publishing the novels with illustrations by Subachi on August 31, 2017, under their Kodansha Ranobe Books imprint. As of December 2019, seven volumes have been released. In March 2022, Kodansha USA announced that they licensed the novels for English publication.

Manga
A manga adaptation illustrated by Mawata began serialization in Kodansha's Niconico Seiga-based manga service Suiyōbi no Sirius on May 30, 2018. As of October 2022, ten tankōbon volumes have been released. In North America, Kodansha USA has also licensed the manga for an English digital release.

Anime
An anime television series adaptation was announced on May 6, 2022. The series will be produced by Maho Film and directed by Takeyuki Yanase, with Yuka Yamada in charge of series composition, characters designed by Miyako Nishida, Eri Kojima, Kaho Deguchi and Yuko Oba, and music composed by Endō. It will premiere in July 2023.

References

External links
  at Shōsetsuka ni Narō 
  
  
 

2017 Japanese novels
2023 anime television series debuts
Anime and manga based on light novels
Fantasy anime and manga
Isekai anime and manga
Isekai novels and light novels
Japanese fantasy novels
Japanese webcomics
Kodansha books
Kodansha manga
Light novels
Light novels first published online
Maho Film
Shōnen manga
Shōsetsuka ni Narō
Upcoming anime television series
Vertical (publisher) titles
Webcomics in print